The Ditch is an Irish political news website established by journalists Eoghan McNeill, Roman Shortall, Chay Bowes and businessman Paddy Cosgrave in April 2021 with the later business name and corporation Ditch Media Limited registered in August 2021. 

The website focuses on investigative journalism and investigations into politicians and since its creation has broken news stories in Ireland relating to Fine Gael party members which have resulted in two Ministers of State resigning from office.

Origins and founders

Paddy Cosgrave has been noted as the primary financial backer of the Ditch although he has no shareholding or directorship in the company. Cosgrave is the organiser behind the Web Summit conferences, which in the early 2010s were hosted annually in Dublin. However, in 2016 Cosgrave pulled Web Summit from Dublin and moved it to Lisbon, Portugal following an argument with the sitting Fine Gael government over a number of issues including grants. Since that dispute, Cosgrave has been described as holding a "grudge" against Fine Gael which has motivated him to support the company. The Ditch maintains Cosgrave has no editorial influence over the publication.  

Eoghan McNeill is a journalist who had formerly worked for the Irish Independent, China Daily and the Cork News. He had also worked for Cosgrave's Web Summit in the past. 

Chay Bowes, a friend of Cosgrave's, was also a founding member of the Ditch. Bowes had previously been involved in supplying information about Leo Varadkar providing a copy of a confidential document on GP contracts to Maitiú Ó Tuathail, president of the National Association of General Practitioners, in a story which was broken by Village Magazine.  Bowes resigned his directorship at the Ditch in June 2022.

Reception
In October 2022 the Phoenix opined that it remained sceptical about supposed non-influence of Cosgrave over the editorial direction of the website. It also remarked that for a website created by people with a background in technology, the website was formated like it had been "designed by a transition-year student".

In a January 2023 podcast, Hugh Linehan and Pat Leahy of the Irish Times stated they welcomed the arrival of the Ditch into the Irish news and media scene, stating they believed that the more scrutiny applied to public figures and politicians in Ireland, they better governance it would produce, regardless if it was a new or old media source producing that scrutiny.

Ownership and revenue
The Ditch is owned by Roman Shortall, Chay Bowes and Eoghan McNeill who each have a third of the company.
 
The site claims to rely upon a voluntary subscription service and donations for income. The business has yet to file a set of accounts as of January 2023.

Key Investigations

An Bord Pleanála 
The publication's first piece to gain traction was a story about discrepancies and undeclared conflicts of interest at An Bord Pleanála which resulted in the resignation of chairperson Paul Hyde. The publication followed up their initial articles by publishing an internal ABP report about "matters of concern" within the planning body in February 2023.

Robert Troy 
In August 2022 the Ditch broke the story that government minister of state Robert Troy had failed to declare a number of property interests. On 24 August, Troy resigned as a Minister of State, insisting he had made genuine errors with his statutory declaration while saying he would not apologise for being a landlord.

Damien English 
In January 2023, the Ditch published a story claiming that minister of state Damien English failed to declare ownership of an existing home in his planning application for a new property in 2008. It also claimed he neglected to declare such ownership in the Dáil register of interests. English resigned as Minister of State on 12 January 2023.

Paschal Donohoe 
In January 2023, allegations that Paschal Donohoe, Minister for Public Expenditure and President of the Eurogroup, had failed to declare donation of services in his 2016 election campaign were launched by the Irish Examiner and Irish Independent. The minister later admitted to discrepancies in his 2020 campaign. The Ditch published several articles about the politician during the following weeks regarding his meetings with the donor Michael Stone, the donor's position on state regeneration boards, and the Minister twice failing to declare directorship of a company.

References

2022 establishments in Ireland
Internet properties established in 2022
Irish news websites
Left-wing politics in Ireland
Mass media in the Republic of Ireland
Newspapers published in the Republic of Ireland